Kue putu or putu bambu is an Indonesian kue. It is made of rice flour called suji and coloured green with pandan leaves, filled with palm sugar, steamed in bamboo tubes (hence the name), and served with desiccated coconut. This traditional bite-sized snack is commonly found in maritime Southeast Asia, particularly in Java, Indonesia, where it is called putu bumbung. 
Kue putu is usually sold by street vendors and can be found in traditional markets, along with other kues. 
Kue putu can also be found in the Netherlands due to its colonial ties with Indonesia.

Ingredients and cooking method
It consists of rice flour with green pandan leaf colouring, filled with ground palm sugar. This green coconut-rice flour ingredients with palm sugar filling is filled into bamboo tube container. Subsequently, the filled bamboo tubes are steamed upon a steam cooker with small holes opening to blow the hot steam. The cooked tubular cakes then pushed out from the bamboo tube container, and served with grated coconut.

Etymology and variations

In Javanese, bumbung means "bamboo" or "a hollow cylindrical object; a tube". As the dish began to spread across the country, the name was later translated to Indonesian putu bambu (bambu: "bamboo"). Hence the name, as it is made by filling a bamboo tube with the ingredients (see the above picture).
Variations of kue putu are often in the shapes or fillings. Kue putu of different shapes with almost identical ingredients, fillings and recipes exist in Southeast Asia. 

The white-colored, flatter disc-shaped putu is called putu piring (Malay for disc/plate putu) and is more common in Malaysia, Kerala and Sri Lanka, while thicker and more round white- or green-coloured putu mangkok (Indonesian for bowl putu) is found more in Indonesia. In Singapore, however, putu mangkok is called kueh tutu.

Traditionally kue putu is filled with palm sugar. Today, however, there are several new variations using different fillings, such as chocolate or abon (beef floss).

Similar dishes
In the Philippines, puto is a generic name for any steamed rice cake. A type of puto very similar to kue putu is puto bumbong which is also cooked in bamboo tubes (bumbong in Tagalog). However puto bumbóng does not use pandan and is traditionally cooked as whole grains, rather than rice flour. It also uses a special purple variety of glutinous rice called pirurutong which gives it a deep purple colour.

In India (Kerala, Tamil Nadu and Karnataka) and Sri Lanka, a similar dish is known as puttu or pittu, though the dessert variety is only predominant in Tamil Nadu.

See also 

 Puttu
 Puto
 Kueh tutu
 Kue
 Klepon
 Kue lapis
 Getuk
 List of steamed foods

References

External links 

 Kue Putu (Indonesian Bamboo Cake) Recipe
 Kue Putu Recipe

Indonesian cuisine
Kue
Foods containing coconut
Steamed foods
Street food in Indonesia
Malaysian snack foods